Naltar Peak is a mountain in Naltar Valley in the Gilgit District of Gilgit-Baltistan, Pakistan. It lies to the southeast of Mehrbani Peak (5,639 m).

References

External links
 Northern Pakistan detailed placemarks in Google Earth

Mountains of Gilgit-Baltistan
Four-thousanders of the Karakoram